Bağarası is a town in Söke district of Aydın Province, Turkey. The population of Bağarası is 6627  as of 2011. The town was a Greek town named Mandıca prior to Turkish War of Independence. After the war according to Population exchange between Greece and Turkey agreement, the Greek population of the town was replaced with Turks from Greece. Main crops of the town are citrus, sunflower and cotton.

References

Populated places in Aydın Province
Towns in Turkey
Söke District